These are the late night schedules on all four networks beginning September 1986. All times are Eastern/Pacific.

PBS is not included, as member television stations have local flexibility over most of their schedules and broadcast times for network shows may vary, CBS, ABC and Fox are not included on the weekend schedules (as the networks do not offer late night programs of any kind on weekends).

Talk/variety shows are highlighted in yellow, network news programs in gold, and local news & programs are highlighted in white background.

Monday-Friday
{| border="1" cellpadding="2"
!bgcolor="#C0C0C0" colspan=2|-
!width="13%" bgcolor="#C0C0C0"|11:00 PM
!width="14%" bgcolor="#C0C0C0"|11:30 PM
!width="13%" bgcolor="#C0C0C0"|12:00 AM
!width="14%" bgcolor="#C0C0C0"|12:30 AM
!width="13%" bgcolor="#C0C0C0"|1:00 AM
!width="14%" bgcolor="#C0C0C0"|1:30 AM
!width="13%" bgcolor="#C0C0C0"|2:00 AM
!width="14%" bgcolor="#C0C0C0"|2:30 AM
!width="13%" bgcolor="#C0C0C0"|3:00 AM
!width="14%" bgcolor="#C0C0C0"|3:30 AM
!width="13%" bgcolor="#C0C0C0"|4:00 AM
!width="14%" bgcolor="#C0C0C0"|4:30 AM
!width="13%" bgcolor="#C0C0C0"|5:00 AM
!width="14%" bgcolor="#C0C0C0"|5:30 AM
|-
!bgcolor="#C0C0C0" rowspan=3|ABC
! bgcolor=#C0C0C0|Fall
|bgcolor="white" rowspan=3|local programming
|bgcolor="gold" rowspan=3|ABC News Nightline
|bgcolor="yellow" colspan="2"|The Dick Cavett Show (Tue.-Wed.)/Jimmy Breslin's People (Thur.-Fri.)
|bgcolor="white" colspan="10"|Local
|-
! bgcolor=#C0C0C0|Winter
|bgcolor="white" colspan="12"|Local
|-
! bgcolor=#C0C0C0|June
|bgcolor="lightgreen" colspan="2"|Monday Sportsnite (Mon.)
|bgcolor="white" colspan="10"|Local
|-
!bgcolor="#C0C0C0" rowspan=3|CBS
! bgcolor=#C0C0C0|Fall
|bgcolor="white" rowspan=3|local programming
|bgcolor="yellow" colspan="4"|CBS Late Night
|bgcolor="white" rowspan=3|local programming
|bgcolor="gold" colspan="8" rowspan=3|CBS News Nightwatch
|-
!bgcolor=#C0C0C0|Winter
|bgcolor="yellow" colspan="4"|CBS Late Night (Mon.-Thur.)/Keep on Cruisin' (Fri., 11:30-12:40)
|-
!bgcolor=#C0C0C0|Summer
|bgcolor="yellow" colspan="4"|CBS Late Night (Mon.-Thur.)/In Person from the Palace (Fri., 11:30-12:40)
|-
!bgcolor="#C0C0C0" rowspan=2|NBC
! bgcolor=#C0C0C0|Fall
|bgcolor="white" rowspan=2|local programming
|bgcolor="yellow" colspan="2" rowspan=2|The Tonight Show Starring Johnny Carson
|bgcolor="yellow" colspan="2"|Late Night with David Letterman (Mon.-Thur.)/Friday Night Videos to 2:00 (Fri)
|bgcolor="white" colspan="9" rowspan=1|local programming  
|-
! bgcolor=#C0C0C0|Summer
|bgcolor="yellow" colspan="2"|Late Night with David Letterman
|bgcolor="yellow" colspan="2"|Friday Night Videos (Fri.)
|bgcolor="white" colspan="7"|local programming
|-
!bgcolor="#C0C0C0" rowspan=2|Fox (launched October 9, 1986)
! bgcolor=#C0C0C0|Fall
|bgcolor="yellow" colspan="2"|The Late Show Starring Joan Rivers 
|bgcolor="white" colspan="12" rowspan=2|local programming      
|-
! bgcolor=#C0C0C0|May
|bgcolor="yellow" colspan="2"|The Late Show
|}

Saturday

Sunday

By network
ABCReturning SeriesNightlineNew SeriesThe Dick Cavett ShowJimmy Breslin's PeopleNot Returning From 1985-86Eye on Hollywood
Lifestyles of the Rich and Famous

CBSReturning SeriesCBS Late Night
CBS News NightwatchNew SeriesIn Person from the PalaceKeep on Cruisin'FoxNew SeriesThe Late ShowNBCReturning Series'Friday Night VideosThe George Michael Sports MachineLate Night with David LettermanSaturday Night LiveThe Tonight Show Starring Johnny Carson''

United States late night network television schedules
1986 in American television
1987 in American television